The 53rd edition of the World Allround Speed Skating Championships for Women took place on 7 and 8 March 1992 in Heerenveen at the Thialf ice rink.

Title holder was Gunda Kleemann from Germany.

Distance medalists

Classification

 DNS = Did not start
 * Fell

Source:

References

Attribution
In Dutch

1990s in speed skating
1990s in women's speed skating
1992 World Allround
1992 in women's speed skating